Olearia xerophila is a species of flowering plant in the family Asteraceae and is endemic northern Australia. It is an erect subshrub with elliptic to broadly elliptic leaves and violet, blue or mauve and yellow, daisy-like inflorescences.

Description

Taxonomy
This daisy was first formally described in 1858 by Ferdinand von Mueller who gave it the name Eurybia xerophila in Fragmenta Phytographiae Australiae from specimens collected near the Burdekin River. In 1867 George Bentham changed the name to Olearia xerophila in Flora Australiensis. The specific epithet (xerophila) means "dry-loving".

Distribution and habitat
Olearia xerophila grows in shrubland or woodland in crevices on rocky hills, scree slopes, gorges or creek beds in the Gascoyne, Murchison and Pilbara bioregions of Western Australia and in northern Queensland.

References

xerophila
Asterales of Australia
Flora of Western Australia
Flora of Queensland
Taxa named by Ferdinand von Mueller
Plants described in 1858